Brayan Sánchez Vergara (born 3 June 1994) is a Colombian road and track cyclist, who currently rides for UCI Continental team . He won the gold medal at the 2016 Pan American Track Cycling Championships in the team pursuit.

Major results

2014
 7th Overall Vuelta a Guatemala
1st  Young rider classification
2016
 6th Overall Joe Martin Stage Race
2018
 10th Overall Joe Martin Stage Race
2021
 Vuelta a Colombia
1st  Mountains classification
1st Stages 3 & 6 (ITT)
 1st Stage 1 Tour du Rwanda
2022
 10th Overall Vuelta del Porvenir San Luis

References

External links

1994 births
Living people
Colombian male cyclists
Colombian track cyclists
Place of birth missing (living people)
Pan American Games medalists in cycling
Pan American Games silver medalists for Colombia
Pan American Games bronze medalists for Colombia
Cyclists at the 2019 Pan American Games
Medalists at the 2019 Pan American Games
20th-century Colombian people
21st-century Colombian people
Competitors at the 2018 South American Games
South American Games gold medalists for Colombia
South American Games medalists in cycling